Pacing may refer to:

In sport
 Pacing, an athletic technique of spreading one's effort out over longer-distance track and field races (also in swimming)
 Pacing (horse gait), a horse gait used in standardbred horse races
 Motor-paced racing, bicycling behind a car or motorcycle to profit from the slipstream

In medicine
 Pacing, an example of psychomotor agitation where a person walks around a room because of mental stress or anxiety
 Pacing (activity management), used to manage symptoms of chronic fatigue syndrome
 Cardiac pacing, regulation of the heart rate, generally in the sense of artificial methods:
Artificial pacemaker, a medical device
Transcutaneous pacing, a means of making the heart beat during a medical emergency

Other uses
 Pacing (surveying), a means of estimating distances by counting the number of paces taken to walk a traverse
 Pacing, a technique in hypnosis and neuro-linguistic programming
 Pacing (narrative), the speed at which a story is told

See also
 Pace (disambiguation)